The Missouri Division of Youth Services (DYS) is a state agency of Missouri that operates juvenile correctional facilities. A division of the Missouri Department of Social Services, DYS has its headquarters in Jefferson City.

History
Circa the 1970s Missouri began shifting its juvenile corrections into a system that emphasizes smaller secure centers and with less emphasis on punishment. By 2006 many states were trying to copy Missouri's system.

Facilities

DYS facilities include:
Camp Avery Park Camp - Troy
Fulton Treatment Center - Fulton
Gentry Residential Treatment Center - Cabool
Green Gables Lodge Treatment Center - Mack's Creek
Hillsboro Treatment Center - Hillsboro
Hogan Street Regional Youth Center - St. Louis
Langsford House Youth Center - Lee's Summit
Missouri Hills Youth Center - St. Louis
Mount Vernon Treatment Center - Mount Vernon
New Madrid Bend Youth Center - New Madrid
Northwest Regional Youth Center - Kansas City
Rich Hill Youth Development Center - Rich Hill
Riverbend Treatment Center - St. Joseph
Sierra-Osage Treatment Center - Poplar Bluff
W. E. Sears Youth Center - Poplar Bluff
Watkins Mill Park Camp - Lawson
Waverly Regional Youth Center - Waverly

Girls' centers:
Wilson’s Creek - Springfield

Former facilities
Missouri Training School for Boys - Boonville
It opened in 1889. Its peak inmate population was 650. In 1938 it had been called the worst juvenile facility in the United States. By 1948 violent prisoners had killed two boys. As a result, Governor of Missouri Phil M. Donnelly removed 71 prisoners from the training school and relocated them to an adult prison. He dismissed the board of the State Board for Training Schools, the juvenile correctional authority. It closed in 1983.
Missouri Training School for Girls - Chillicothe
It opened in 1889, and closed in 1981.
Missouri Training School for Negro Girls - Tipton - Opened in 1926, closed in 1956 and consolidated into the school in Chillicothe.
Rosa Parks Center - Fulton - A center for incarcerated girls, it is a former university dormitory, located at William Woods University. It holds 10-12 girls at a time. WWU students are involved with the center.
DYS and WWU agreed to the joint project in 2000, and the center opened in January 2001 and shut down due to lack of state funding in August 2020.
Babler Lodge - Wildwood Shut down August 2020
Montgomery City Youth Center - Montgomery City Closed August 2020
Northeast Community Treatment Center - Mexico Closed about 2016
Delmina Woods, Forsyth, Missouri - Permanently Closed
Cornerstone Group Home, Columbia, Missouri - Permanently Closed in 2020

References

Further reading
 Dubin, Jennifer. "Metamorphosis: How Missouri Rehabilitates Juvenile Offenders" (Archive). American Educator. Summer 2012. p. 2-11.

External links

 Missouri Division of Youth Services
 The Missouri Approach
Publications by or about  Missouri Division of Youth Services at Internet Archive.

Division of Youth
State corrections departments of the United States
Juvenile detention centers in the United States